The Campeonato de Apertura (Opening Championship) was an annual competition for Chilean football teams at the beginning of the season. It was played from 1933 to 1950, but didn't have regularity through years, not being played in 1935, 1936, 1939, 1943, 1945, 1946 and 1948. The Campeonato de Apertura was sometimes disputed in a knock-out system, other times in a mini-league system.  It is considered as the precursor of Copa Chile, Chile's official cup competition that started in 1958.

Nowadays, there are in Chilean football two national league competitions per year, one of them called Torneo de Apertura (Opening Tournament). In spite of its name, it has nothing to do with the former Campeonato initiated in 1933.

Finals

Titles by club

Notes and references

Chile Cup - RSSSF

Football competitions in Chile
Chile